Okano is a department of Woleu-Ntem Province in northern Gabon. The capital lies at Mitzic. It had a population of 16,630 in 2013.

Towns and villages

References

Woleu-Ntem Province
Departments of Gabon